The 2008–09 Scottish League Cup was the 63rd season of the Scotland's second most prestigious football knockout competition, also known for sponsorship reasons as the Co-operative Insurance Cup. Celtic won the cup beating Rangers 2–0 after extra time thanks to a goal from Darren O'Dea and an Aiden McGeady penalty.

Calendar

First round
The First round draw was conducted at Hampden Park on 2008-07-22.

Source: Scottish Football League

Second round
The second round draw was conducted at The Signet Library, Edinburgh on 2008-08-11.

Source: Scottish Football League

Third round
The Third round draw was conducted at Hampden Park, Glasgow on 2008-09-01.

Source: Scottish Football League

Quarter-finals
The quarter-final draw was conducted at Hampden Park, Glasgow on 25 September 2008.

Semi-finals
The semi-final draw was conducted at the Scottish Parliament, Edinburgh on 12 November 2008 by First Minister Alex Salmond, a representative of sponsors Co-operative Insurance and the Presiding Officer of the Parliament, Alex Fergusson.

Final

Awards
A team, player and young player were chosen by the Scottish sports press as the top performers in each round.

Media coverage
In Australia the Scottish League Cup was available on SBS and Setanta Sports who also broadcast it in Ireland. In the UK the Scottish League Cup was broadcast on BBC Scotland and BBC Red Button.

External links
 BBC Scottish Cups page
 SFL page

References

Scottish League Cup seasons
League Cup
Scottish League Cup, 2008-09